Maidi Lake is a freshwater lake located in the Pokhara municipality of Kaski, Nepal.

It is the smallest of many lakes of Pokhara and is spread over 1.17 hectares. It has also been reported to be contracting every year, due to erosion on the upper part of the lake.

References

Lakes of Gandaki Province
Kaski District